Ümera jõel (English: On the Ümera River)is a novel by Estonian author Mait Metsanurk, set the fictional parish of Mägiste located in South Estonia in the early 13th century. It was first published in 1934.

See also
 Battle of Ümera

Estonian novels
1934 novels
Novels set in the 13th century
Novels set in Estonia